Kiatisuk Senamuang (born 11 August 1973) is a Thai football manager and former footballer (played between 1989 and October 2007) who is manager of V.League 1 club Hoàng Anh Gia Lai.

He is nicknamed "Thai Zico" by fans. During his eighteen-year career Kiatisuk played as a striker and scored 251 goals in 339 appearances. The former striker played for clubs in Malaysia, Singapore, England and Vietnam as well as in his homeland. Kiatisuk also earned 131 caps and scored 70 goals for Thailand between 1992 and 2007. In 1996, while playing for Raj Pracha FC Kiatisuk scored 127 goals in 71 games, achieving an (unrecognised) record as top scorer.

Between 2014 and 2017, Kiatisuk was manager of the Thai senior team and, (2013–2016), the Thailand U-23 team. Previously, in 2013, he had also been the caretaker manager of Thailand.

Kiatisuk has a Bachelor of Business Administration from Dhurakij Pundit University and Master of Business Administration from Chandrakasem Rajabhat University.

Playing career

Club career
Kiatisuk Senamuang played with Perlis in Malaysia before joining an English club Huddersfield Town in 1999, which the then manager, Steve Bruce, considered merely a publicity stunt. After one season, in which he did not feature in the Huddersfield Town first team squad, Kiatisuk left English football for Rajpracha Sports Club in Thailand, later joining Singapore Armed Forces FC where he scored 15 goals in 20 games. In March 2002, he moved once again to become a star in Vietnam with Hoàng Anh Gia Lai, where he helped win the V.League 1 title several times. He returned to play for the Thailand national football team in the King's Cup.

International career
Kiatisuk played 131 international matches and scored 70 goals for the national team. Both figures are Thai national records.

Managerial career

Vietnam

After retiring from playing in 2006, Kiatisuk went straight into management with V-League side Hoàng Anh Gia Lai

Return to Thailand
In 2008, Kiatisuk returned to Thailand to take charge of Chula United. In 2009, Kiatisuk became the head coach of Chonburi F.C. and led the club to win the 2009 Kor Royal Cup. Kiatisuk managed to finish the season in second place, with the highest points ever achieved by the club. Nevertheless, after failing to secure the domestic league title he resigned.

Second spell in Vietnam
Kiatisuk went to Vietnam again to manage his former club Hoàng Anh Gia Lai. He finished his season in the V-League in seventh place. He led Hoàng Anh Gia Lai to the final of the 2010 Vietnamese Cup but lost 0–1 to Sông Lam Nghệ An at Thống Nhất Stadium, Ho Chi Minh City.

Back to Thailand again
In December 2010, Kiatisuk returned to Thailand as the head coach of Chula United in Division 1. He brought the club to third place by the end of the season resulting in promotion to the 2012 Thai Premier League. After ten games in the top league, Kiatisuk resigned from his position due to poor results: 1 win, 4 draws, and 5 losses.

A month later, Kiatisuk decided to join Bangkok F.C. in the 2012 Thai Division 1 League to help the club to avoid relegation. Bangkok survived in the second league of Thailand after finishing in tenth place (in the middle of the table).

The national manager
In January 2013, Kiatisuk was appointed to be the head coach of Thailand U-23. He won 1–0 in his debut match in the friendly against Ayutthaya F.C. of Division 1 on 12 January.

In June 2013, Kiatisuk was appointed as a caretaker head coach of Thailand senior team, replacing Winfried Schaefer. His debut match as head coach of the War Elephants was in a friendly against China on 15 June 2013, which the Thais won 5–1. He was also responsible as the head coach for the Thailand U-23 team preparing for the 2013 SEA Games.

As head coach of Thailand U-23, Kiatisuk guided the team to 2013 SEA Games gold, adding to the four golds he won as a player in four straight Games from 1993 to 1999. He also led Thailand U-23 to the semi-finals at 2014 Asian Games and finished in 4th place.

In 2014, due to his success in 2014 Asian Games, Kiatisuk was appointed to be a permanent head coach of Thailand to compete in the 2014 AFF Championship. Using mainly young players from his former U-23 side, he led Thailand to the victory with a 4–3 aggregate score against Malaysia in the final, becoming the only person to win the AFF Championship as both a player and a manager.

In 2015, for the second round of 2018 FIFA World Cup qualification, Thailand was drawn in the same group as Iraq, Vietnam and Chinese Taipei. With Kiattisuk as manager, the team finished as the winner of the group with 14 points from six games. Thailand advanced to the final round of qualification.

In 2016, Kiatisuk managed the Thai side to defend the title in the 2016 AFF Championship. Having won all the games en route to the final, on 14 December Thailand lost 1–2 at Pakansari Stadium against Indonesia in the first leg of the final. Nevertheless, Thailand managed to secure a return of the trophy with a 2–0 win at Rajamangala Stadium and lifted their fifth regional title on 17 December 2016. Kiattisuk became the third manager, after Peter Withe and Radojko Avramović, to successfully defend the AFF Championship title.

Kiatisuk continued to coach Thailand in the final round of World Cup qualification. However, he managed to collect only one point from seven games of the qualification. Three days after a 0–4 loss to Japan at Saitama Stadium 2002 on 28 March 2017, Kiatisuk stepped down from his position as the manager of the national team after four years in charge.

After his spell at the national team, Kiatisuk shortly managed Thai League T1 club Port F.C. in 2017, but resigned due to poor results.

Back to Hoàng Anh Gia Lai
On 20 November 2020, Kiatisuk was appointed head coach with a two-year contract of Hoàng Anh Gia Lai, his former Vietnamese club. His first match in charge was on 17 January 2021 away against Saigon. The game ended in a 1–0 defeat. On 22 January 2021, Kiatisuk won his first game in a 2–1 home win over Sông Lam Nghệ An.

At the time of the cancelation of 2021 V.League 1 due to COVID-19 pandemic, Kiatisuk's Hoàng Anh Gia Lai were the 1st place in the league table with 29 points from 12 games and qualified for the AFC Champions League, but the season was voided and the title was not awarded.

Managerial statistics

 A win or loss by penalty shoot-out is counted as a draw.
 Kiatisuk Senamuang managed the team on a one-off basis as caretaker-manager.
 Only FIFA approved games are counted for Thailand.

International goals

Personal life
Kiatisuk is a Buddhist born in Udon Thani. Before he became a professional football player, he worked as a police officer, but always had a love for football. According to a friend, "his move to football was prompted by insecurity".

He was given the nickname Zico by his friends, in honour of his favourite Brazilian football idol Zico.

Kiatisuk learned Vietnamese and spoke fluently Vietnamese language just after 1–2 years during his career in Vietnam.

He has three daughters, their nicknames are Perth, Proud and Pearl.

Honours

Player

International
Thailand
 AFF Championship Champion (3); 1996, 2000, 2002
 Sea Games Gold Medal (4); 1993, 1995, 1997, 1999
 King's Cup Winner (3); 1994, 2000, 2006
 Indonesian Independence Cup Winner (1); 1994
 Asian Games Fourth place (2); 1998, 2002

Club
Krung Thai Bank
 Kor Royal Cup Winners (1); 1989
 Khǒr Royal Cup Winners (1); 1993

Singapore Armed Forces
 S.League Winners (1); 2002

Hoang Anh Gia Lai
 V.League 1 Winners (2); 2003, 2004
 Vietnamese Super Cup Winners (2); 2003, 2004

Individual
 AFF Championship Most Valuable Player: 2000
 V.League 1 Best Foreign Player of the year: 2003, 2004
AFC Asian All Stars: 2000

Manager

International
Thailand
 AFF Championship: 2014, 2016
 King's Cup: 2016

Thailand U-23
 SEA Games  Gold Medal: 2013
 Asian Games Fourth place: 2014

Club
Chonburi
 Kor Royal Cup: 2009

Hoang Anh Gia Lai
 Vietnamese National Cup runner-up; 2010
 Quang Trung Emperor's Cup Winner: 2022

Individual
AFF Coach of the Year: 2015, 2017 
V.League 1 Manager of the Month: January and March 2021, April 2021, July 2022

In popular culture
Kiatisuk became the first Thai footballer along with some others to appear in a video game when he appeared in World Soccer Jikkyou Winning Eleven 2000: U-23 Medal Heno Chousen as a player of the Thailand U-23 team. His name in the game is "Senamuran" (セナムラン).

See also
List of men's footballers with 100 or more international caps
List of men's footballers with 50 or more international goals
Top international football goalscorers by country

References

External links
Fan site

1973 births
Living people
Kiatisuk Senamuang
Kiatisuk Senamuang
Association football forwards
Kiatisuk Senamuang
Thai expatriate footballers
Kiatisuk Senamuang
Expatriate footballers in Malaysia
Expatriate footballers in England
Huddersfield Town A.F.C. players
1996 AFC Asian Cup players
2007 AFC Asian Cup players
Kiatisuk Senamuang
FIFA Century Club
Expatriate footballers in Vietnam
Thai expatriate sportspeople in Vietnam
Perlis FA players
Thailand national football team managers
Expatriate footballers in Singapore
Warriors FC players
Singapore Premier League players
Footballers at the 1994 Asian Games
Footballers at the 1998 Asian Games
Footballers at the 2002 Asian Games
Kiatisuk Senamuang
Southeast Asian Games medalists in football
Competitors at the 1993 Southeast Asian Games
Competitors at the 1995 Southeast Asian Games
Competitors at the 1997 Southeast Asian Games
Competitors at the 1999 Southeast Asian Games
Kiatisuk Senamuang
Thai expatriate sportspeople in England
Thai expatriate sportspeople in Malaysia